Kermia caletria is a species of sea snail, marine gastropod mollusk in the family Raphitomidae.  Measuring a length of 4.5 mm, with a 1.5 mm diameter, the species is white and slightly ochraceous at the sutures. It contains seven whorls, turreted, two smooth whorls being apical, finely and regularly clathrate. The aperture is sinuously-oblong. The crenulate outer lip is simple within. The columellar margin is minutely toothed towards the base. The sinus is wide. The siphonal canal is a little produced. There is a very pale ochraceous band round the middle of the body whorl, as at the sutures. The sinus is deeply cut behind. At the sutural margin of the outer lip is a bright ochraceous thickened callus.

Distribution
This marine species occurs off New Caledonia.

References

 Liu J.Y. [Ruiyu] (ed.). (2008). Checklist of marine biota of China seas. China Science Press. 1267 pp.

External links
 Tröndlé, J. E. A. N., and Michel Boutet. "Inventory of marine molluscs of French Polynesia." Atoll Research Bulletin (2009)
 
 Biolib.cz : image

caletria
Gastropods described in 1896